El diario de Daniela (English title: The diary of Daniela or Daniela's Diary) is a Mexican child telenovela produced by Rosy Ocampo for Televisa in 1998.

On Monday, November 23, 1998, Canal de las Estrellas started broadcasting El diario de Daniela weekdays at 4:00pm, replacing Gotita de amor. The last episode was broadcast on Friday, April 16, 1999 with El niño que vino del mar replacing it on Monday April 19, 1999.

Yolanda Ventura and Marcelo Buquet (then changed with Gerardo Murguía) starred as adult protagonists, Daniela Luján and Martín Ricca starred as child protagonists, while Mónika Sánchez, Odiseo Bichir, Roberto Ballesteros, David Ostrosky, Mariana Huerdo, Carlos Peniche, Melina Escobedo and Fernando Rodríguez starred as main antagonists. Leticia Calderón starred as special participation.

Plot 
Daniela Monroy is a sweet girl who lives with her family made up of her parents Enrique and Leonor, her older sister Adela and her little brother Juancho. She has a journal where she writes all her wishes, secrets, illusions and dreams. Enrique is the owner of a theater, the main stage of the telenovela, where Daniela and her inseparable group of friends always get together. But the happiness of Daniela and her family is abruptly broken when her mother, the loving Leonor, drowns in an accident. From here on, misfortune will haunt the Monroy family, as Elena, a beautiful but unscrupulous woman, is sickly obsessed with obtaining Enrique's love and will seek by all means to be his legitimate wife.

At the same time, the story of another boy unfolds, Martín Linares, a handsome and intelligent boy with a broken family. His parents, Pepe and Rita, divorced and although Pepe, Enrique's best friend, adores his son, he cannot visit him as he wanted since Rita won custody of his son and remarried Gustavo, a violent man who abuses Martin.

Despite all the misfortunes, Daniela and Martín live an innocent childhood love and will fight so that life smiles at them as before.

Cast 
 
Yolanda Ventura as Natalia Navarro
Marcelo Buquet as Enrique Monroy #1 (eps. 1-70)
Gerardo Murguía as Enrique Monroy #2 (eps. 71-100)
Daniela Luján as Daniela Monroy
Martín Ricca as Martín Linares Moreno
Gaspar Henaine "Capulina" as Don Capu
Mónika Sánchez as Elena Ruiz
Odiseo Bichir as Joel Castillo
Anahí as Adela Monroy
Juan Pablo Gamboa as Pepe Linares
Marcela Páez as Rita Moreno de Corona
Amparo Arozamena as Amparito
María Prado as Doña Emma
Héctor Hernández as Jaime
Fernando Torre Laphan as Ángel Corona
Claudia Vega as Mariana Gómez
María Alicia Delgado as Eva García
Eduardo Liñán as Detective Quintana
Eduardo López Rojas as Pedro Farías
Manuel Saval as Andrés Zamora
Roberto Ballesteros as Arturo Barto
David Ostrosky as Gustavo Corona
Jorge Poza as Carlos
Mariana Huerdo as Tania
Mónica Riestra as Crista de Linares
Carlos Peniche as Ricky Rey
Paulina de Labra as Flor
Ehécatl Chávez as Jairo
Yulyenette Anaya as Lidi Parker
Isaac Castro as Yuls
Melina Escobedo as Malú
Pablo Poumian as Toby
Óscar Larios as Chuy
Christopher von Uckermann as Christopher Robin
Fernando Rodríguez as Sergio
Odemaris Ruiz as Gina
Rodrigo Soberon as Juancho Monroy
Fátima Torre as Fátima
Yamil Yitani Maccise as Yamil
Enrique Borja Baena
Special participation
Leticia Calderón as Leonor de Monroy

References

External links

1998 telenovelas
Mexican telenovelas
1998 Mexican television series debuts
1999 Mexican television series endings
Spanish-language telenovelas
Television shows set in Mexico City
Televisa telenovelas
Children's telenovelas
Television series about children